Defluviimonas is a genus of bacteria from the family of Rhodobacteraceae.

References

Further reading 
 
 

Rhodobacteraceae
Bacteria genera